Orosi (from Oro, Spanish for "Gold") is a census-designated place (CDP) in Tulare County, California, United States. The population was 8,770 at the 2010 census, up from 7,318 at the 2000 census.

History
The community was founded in 1888 by Daniel R. Shafer.  It was named "oro," or gold, for the golden poppies covering the nearby fields.  A post office was established in 1892.

Nearly eight percent of Orosi's population is Filipino, and Orosi has its own Little Manila.

Geography
Orosi is located at  (36.542448, -119.288808).

Demographics

2010
The 2010 United States Census reported that Orosi had a population of 8,770. The racial makeup of Orosi was 3,861 (44.0%) White, 65 (0.7%) African American, 57 (0.6%) Native American, 803 (9.2%) Asian, 1 (0.0%) Pacific Islander, 3,638 (41.5%) from other races, and 345 (3.9%) from two or more races. Hispanic or Latino of any race were 7,606 persons (86.7%).

The Census reported that 8,770 people (100% of the population) lived in households, 0 (0%) lived in non-institutionalized group quarters, and 0 (0%) were institutionalized.

There were 1,985 households, out of which 1,285 (64.7%) had children under the age of 18 living in them, 1,180 (59.4%) were opposite-sex married couples living together, 375 (18.9%) had a female householder with no husband present, 197 (9.9%) had a male householder with no wife present.  There were 196 (9.9%) unmarried opposite-sex partnerships, and 7 (0.4%) same-sex married couples or partnerships. 167 households (8.4%) were made up of individuals, and 85 (4.3%) had someone living alone who was 65 years of age or older. The average household size was 4.42.  There were 1,752 families (88.3% of all households); the average family size was 4.50.

The population was spread out, with 3,086 people (35.2%) under the age of 18, 1,083 people (12.3%) aged 18 to 24, 2,397 people (27.3%) aged 25 to 44, 1,552 people (17.7%) aged 45 to 64, and 652 people (7.4%) who were 65 years of age or older.  The median age was 26.4 years. For every 100 females, there were 107.0 males.  For every 100 females age 18 and over, there were 108.1 males.

The homeowner vacancy rate was 2.6%; the rental vacancy rate was 3.7%.  4,928 people (56.2% of the population) lived in owner-occupied housing units and 3,842 people (43.8%) lived in rental housing units.

2000
As of the census of 2000, there were 7,318 people, 1,678 households, and 1,461 families residing in the CDP. The racial makeup of the CDP was 29.42% White, 0.36% African American, 0.92% Native American, 10.21% Asian, 0.03% Pacific Islander, 53.53% from other races, and 5.55% from two or more races. Hispanic or Latino of any race were 81.99% of the population.

There were 1,678 households, out of which 53.5% had children under the age of 18 living with them, 64.4% were married couples living together, 15.1% had a female householder with no husband present, and 12.9% were non-families. 10.0% of all households were made up of individuals, and 6.7% had someone living alone who was 65 years of age or older.  The average household size was 4.36 and the average family size was 4.49.

In the CDP, the population was spread out, with 35.8% under the age of 18, 13.3% from 18 to 24, 28.0% from 25 to 44, 14.8% from 45 to 64, and 8.1% who were 65 years of age or older.  The median age was 26 years. For every 100 females, there were 111.8 males.  For every 100 females age 18 and over, there were 114.6 males.

The median income for a household in the CDP was $30,400, and the median income for a family was $29,600. Males had a median income of $17,323 versus $19,195 for females. The per capita income for the CDP was $7,928.  About 25.2% of families and 30.9% of the population were below the poverty line, including 40.3% of those under age 18 and 8.4% of those age 65 or over.

Government

In the United States House of Representatives, Orosi is in

Education
The community is served by the Cutler-Orosi Joint Unified School District.  Senior students attend Orosi High School.

A campus of the College of the Sequoias is located on Orosi High School grounds.

Notable people
 Mike Garcia, professional baseball player.
 Tad Wieman, college football player and coach; member of College Football Hall of Fame.
 Ariana Rodriguez-Perez, college soccer player; member of the 2017 undefeated conference, state and National title team. Also named to the 2018 1st Team United Soccer Coaches All-America Team

See also
East Orosi, California- though commonly considered merely the east side of Orosi, it is its own CDP with a population of approximately 500.

References

Census-designated places in Tulare County, California
Census-designated places in California